Thassha Vitayaviroj (10 June 1986) is a Thai former professional tennis player.

Vitayaviroj has career-high WTA rankings of 439 in singles, achieved on 2 May 2005, and 320 in doubles, set on 24 April 2006. She has won 5 doubles titles on the ITF Women's Circuit. Her only WTA Tour main draw appearance came at the 2002 Volvo Women's Open, where she partnered with Montinee Tangphong in the doubles event.

Playing for Thailand at the Fed Cup, Vitayaviroj has a win–loss record of 0–1.

ITF finals

Singles (0–1)

Doubles (5–7)

Fed Cup participation

Doubles

References

External links
 
 

1986 births
Thassha Vitayaviroj
Competitors at the 2005 Southeast Asian Games
Thassha Vitayaviroj
Thassha Vitayaviroj
Thassha Vitayaviroj
Southeast Asian Games medalists in tennis
Living people
Thassha Vitayaviroj
Thassha Vitayaviroj